In the National Football League (NFL), the highest official passer rating that a quarterback can achieve is 158.3, which is called a "perfect passer rating". To qualify, during a single game a quarterback must attempt at least 10 passes, have zero interceptions, have a minimum completion percentage of 77.5%, have a minimum of 11.875% of their passes score touchdowns, and have a minimum of 12.5 yards per attempt. The passer rating was developed in 1971.

As of the 2020 NFL season, there have been 64 different players, playing in 78 distinct games, who have achieved a perfect passer rating. Four of these games have occurred in the post-season. Eight quarterbacks have achieved the feat more than once: Ben Roethlisberger and Peyton Manning each have four; Kurt Warner and Tom Brady each have three; and Craig Morton, Dave Krieg, Ken O'Brien, and Lamar Jackson each have two.

Ben Roethlisberger (2007) and Lamar Jackson (2019) are the only quarterbacks with multiple perfect ratings in a single regular season. Three teams have had two different quarterbacks achieve a perfect rating in the same season. The Cleveland Browns were first in 1954, with Otto Graham (week 3) and George Ratterman (week 7). They were followed by Dick Shiner (week 1) and Bob Lee (week 5) of the Atlanta Falcons in 1973, and the San Francisco 49ers with Steve Young (week 7) and Joe Montana (week 10) both earning perfect ratings in 1989. Peyton Manning had one perfect rating in the 2003 regular season and one in the post-season.

Drew Bledsoe, Robert Griffin III, and Marcus Mariota are the only quarterbacks to achieve a perfect passer rating in their rookie seasons, with Mariota being the only quarterback to post one in his NFL debut.

Five of these performances were in a losing cause, though Chad Pennington is the only quarterback to play from start to finish and record both a loss and a perfect rating. Thirteen quarterbacks have had a game where they earned a perfect 158.3 passer rating and also a game where they earned a 0.0, the lowest possible passer rating, during their careers: Otto Graham, Johnny Unitas, Joe Namath, Terry Bradshaw, Len Dawson, Bob Griese, James Harris, Bob Lee, Scott Hunter, Craig Morton, Dan Fouts, Vince Evans, Eli Manning, Peyton Manning, and Geno Smith. Geno Smith had a perfect rating and the lowest possible rating in the same season (2014).

List

Statistics
Only Nick Foles has accomplished a perfect passer rating with seven touchdowns thrown. Two quarterbacks have accomplished a perfect passer rating with six touchdowns thrown: Peyton Manning was the first to achieve the record on September 28, 2003, against the New Orleans Saints, while Tom Brady matched the feat on October 21, 2007, against the Miami Dolphins. Thirteen quarterbacks have accomplished a perfect game with only two touchdowns thrown. It is impossible to achieve a perfect game with only one touchdown because of the 10 passing attempt minimum to qualify, combined with the minimum 11.875% touchdown-to-attempted-pass ratio.

Only six quarterbacks have accomplished a perfect passer rating with 30 or more attempts.  Ken O'Brien threw 26-for-32 in his perfect game for a completion rate of 81%, while Kurt Warner threw 24 of 30 in the second of his three perfect games for a completion rate of 80%, Jared Goff threw 26 of 33 in his perfect game for a completion rate of 78.8%, Dak Prescott threw 25 of 32 for 405 yards for a completion rate of 78.1%, Deshaun Watson threw 28 of 33 for 426 yards for a completion rate of 84.8%, while Aaron Rodgers threw 25 of 31 for 429 yards and a completion percentage of 80.6%. Ryan Tannehill holds the record for completion rate in a perfect game, throwing 18 of 19 for 94.7% in his 2015 perfect game. Chris Chandler has the best rate for a game with at least 20 pass attempts (23 of 26) for 88% completed in his 1995 perfect game.

Seven quarterbacks have accomplished a perfect passer rating with more than 400 passing yards. Ken O'Brien threw for 431 yards on November 2, 1986, against the Seattle Seahawks. Nick Foles threw for 406 yards on November 3, 2013, against the Oakland Raiders. Jared Goff  threw for 465 yards on September 27, 2018, against the Minnesota Vikings. Dak Prescott threw for 405 yards on September 8, 2019, against the New York Giants. Deshaun Watson threw for 426 yards on October 6, 2019, against the Atlanta Falcons. Aaron Rodgers threw for 429 yards on October 20, 2019, against the Oakland Raiders. Only three quarterbacks have accomplished a perfect game with fewer than 150 passing yards.  Scott Hunter threw for 138 yards on October 31, 1976, against the New Orleans Saints, Drew Bledsoe threw for 143 yards on December 26, 1993, against the Indianapolis Colts, and Rich Gannon threw for 146 yards on October 15, 1992, against the Detroit Lions.

Ben Roethlisberger has the record of accomplishing a perfect passer rating with most yards per pass attempt with 19.8 on September 11, 2005.

Only three quarterbacks have accomplished a perfect passer rating in their rookie season. Drew Bledsoe of the New England Patriots achieved it against the Indianapolis Colts on December 26, 1993; Robert Griffin III of the Washington Redskins did it against the Philadelphia Eagles on November 18, 2012; and Marcus Mariota of the Tennessee Titans did it against the Tampa Bay Buccaneers on September 13, 2015, the first quarterback to do so in his professional debut. Only two QBs have accomplished a perfect passer rating twice in one season: Ben Roethlisberger, against the Ravens on November 5, 2007; and against the St. Louis Rams on December 20, 2007; Lamar Jackson against the Dolphins on September 8, 2019; and against the Bengals on November 10, 2019. Peyton Manning had one perfect rating in the 2003 regular season and one in the post-season.

On two occasions two quarterbacks achieved a perfect passer rating on the same day. On October 28, 1978, Steve Grogan of the New England Patriots and Brian Sipe of the Cleveland Browns both achieved the perfect passer rating of 158.3. Steve Grogan threw 15 of 19 for 281 yards and 4 touchdowns and Brian Sipe threw 12 of 15 for 217 yards and 3 touchdowns. On September 8, 2019, Lamar Jackson of the Baltimore Ravens and Dak Prescott of the Dallas Cowboys both achieved the perfect passer rating.

Tom Brady of the Tampa Bay Buccaneers is the oldest quarterback to ever post a perfect passer rating, on December 26, 2020, against the Detroit Lions. He was 43 years, 4 months, and 23 days old when he accomplished his (third) record feat. Brady also holds the largest time span between first and last achievements, with 13 years, 2 months and 5 days.

See also
Perfect game (baseball)
300-point game (bowling)
Maximum break (snooker)
Nine dart finish (darts)
List of NFL quarterbacks who have posted a passer rating of zero
List of 500-yard passing games in the National Football League

References

Passing rating
NFL Quarterbacks Passing Rating
Quarterbacks Passing Rating
Quarterbacks Passing Rating
Perfect scores in sports